George William Campbell, 6th Duke of Argyll,  (22 September 1768 – 22 October 1839), styled Earl of Campbell from 1768 to 1770 and Marquess of Lorne from 1770 to 1806, was a Scottish Whig politician and nobleman.

Background
Argyll was the eldest son of John Campbell, 5th Duke of Argyll and his wife, Elizabeth Campbell, 1st Baroness Hamilton, daughter of Colonel John Gunning.

Career
Argyll sat as Member of Parliament for St Germans from 1790 to 1796. In 1806 he succeeded his father in the dukedom and entered the House of Lords. He was Lord Keeper of the Great Seal of Scotland from 1827 to 1828 and again from 1830 and 1839. In 1833 he was sworn of the Privy Council and appointed Lord Steward of the Household in the Whig administration headed by Lord Grey, a position he retained when Lord Melbourne became prime minister in July 1834. The Whigs fell from power in November 1834 but returned to office already in April 1835, when Argyll once again became Lord Steward under Melbourne. He continued in the post until his death in 1839. Argyll was also Lord-Lieutenant of Argyllshire from 1799 to 1839.

Family
Argyll married Lady Caroline Elizabeth Villiers, daughter of George Villiers, 4th Earl of Jersey, at Edinburgh, on 29 November 1810. She was the former wife of Argyll's friend Henry Paget, 1st Marquess of Anglesey. They had no children. He died in October 1839, aged 71 at Inveraray Castle, Argyllshire, and was buried on 10 November 1839 at Kilmun Parish Church in Kilmun, Cowal. His brother, Lord John Campbell, succeeded to his titles.

References

External links

1768 births
1839 deaths
Lorne, George Campbell, Marquess of
Whig (British political party) MPs for English constituencies
6
Campbell, George
Lord-Lieutenants of Argyllshire
Members of the Privy Council of the United Kingdom
Lorne, George Campbell, Marquess of
19th-century Scottish landowners
G